Bytham Castle was a castle in the village of Castle Bytham in Lincolnshire (.)

The castle is thought to be of early Norman origin. The earthworks, on a hill above the village, are visible but nothing of the stonework is above ground.

There is no public access to the monument. There is however a public footpath that runs alongside the castle mound and up a hill to give reasonable view.

References

Further reading
Fry, Plantagenet Somerset, The David & Charles Book of Castles, David & Charles, 1980. 

Castles in Lincolnshire
Ruins in Lincolnshire
11th-century establishments in England
Bytham